Christopher Heyward III is an American professional wrestler, better known by his ring name Calvin Tankman. He is currently working as a freelancer and is best known for his tenures with Major League Wrestling and IWA Mid-South.

Professional wrestling career

IWA Mid-South (2016–present)
One of his first matches as a professional wrestler was at IWA Mid-South's 20th Anniversary Show on October 6, 2016, where he competed in a 20-man rumble match against other superstars such as the winner Randi West, Ian Rotten and Trey Miguel. Heyward is known for his tenure with IWA Mid-South, where he was a former IWA Mid-South Heavyweight Champion, title which he won at IWA Mid-South Spring Heat 2018  on April 12 after defeating Mance Warner. At IWA Mid-South A Hard Day's Night on January 19, 2018, he unsuccessfully defended Eddie Kingston and Homicide's IWA Mid-South Tag Team Championship alone against Unfortunate Pairing (Elliott Paul and Pat Monix) in a 2-on-1 handicap match, being still unknown if he was recognized champion or not. He did have another successful defense alongside at Homicide IWA Mid-South Simply The Best 11 December 14, 2017 against Jake Parnell and Shane Mercer. His last appearance for IWA was at IWA Mid-South Card Subject To Change on December 19, 2020, where he fell short to Vincent Nothing.

Major League Wrestling (2020–present)
Heyward made his first appearance for Major League Wrestling (MLW) on the November 25, 2020 episode of Fusion, where he scored a victory against enhancement talent Robert Martyr. He was heavily pushed with wins over Zenshi and the AAA World Cruiserweight Champion Laredo Kid in a non-title match on Fusion. At Never Say Never on March 31, 2021, Heyward unsuccessfully challenged Jacob Fatu for the MLW World Heavyweight Championship.

On February 26, 2022 Calvin Tankman and a tag team wrestling partner of his by the name of E. J. Nduka defeated 5150 and became the MLW World Tag Team Champions at the Grady Cole Center in North Carolina event that was sold out.

On January 7th, 2023 Calvin and his tag team partner Nduka lost their MLW World Tag Team Championships to The Samoan SWAT Team's Juice Finau and Lance Anoa'i at MLW's pay-per-view Blood and Thunder of year 2023.

Game Changer Wrestling (2020–present) 
At Game Changer Wrestling's Joey Janela's Spring Break 4 from October 10, 2020, Heyward participated in a 30-person battle royal where he competed against various wrestlers such as the winner Nate Webb, Shark Boy, JTG, Flash Flanagan, Marko Stunt and Joey Janela. He also competed at GCW Josh Barnett's Bloodsport 3 on October 11, 2020, an event produced by Game Changer Wrestling in partnership with Josh Barnett, where he defeated Alexander James by way of knockout. At GCW Josh Barnett's Bloodsport 4 February 13, 2021, he fell short to Davey Boy Smith Jr. by way of submission. At GCW Josh Barnett's Bloodsport 5 from February 20, 2021, Heyward scored a victory against Nolan Edward by way of knockout.

Championships and accomplishments
AAW: Wrestling Redefined
AAW Tag Team Championship (1 time, current) - with Jah-C
Bizarro Lucha
Bizarro Lucha Luchaversal Championship (1 time, current)
Black Label Pro
BLP Heavyweight Championship (2 times, current)
Deadlock Pro-Wrestling
DPW National Championship (1 time)
DPW National Championship Tournament (2022)
Freelance Underground
FU Heavyweight Championship (1 time, current)
IWA Mid-South
IWA Mid-South Heavyweight Championship (1 time)
Major League Wrestling
 MLW World Tag Team Championship (1 time) - with E. J. Nduka
New Wave Pro Wrestling
NWP Crossroads Championship (1 time)
Paradigm Pro Wrestling
MidwestTerritory.com Championship (1 time)
MidwestTerritory.com Interim Championship (1 time)
Pro Wrestling Illustrated
 Ranked No. 134 of the top 500 singles wrestlers in the PWI 500 in 2021
 Ranked No. 138 of the top 500 singles wrestlers in the PWI 500 in 2022
Wild Championship Wrestling Outlaws
WCWO Tag Team Championship (1 time) - with Dale Patricks
Wrestling Theology Fellowship
WTF Championship (1 time)
Blizzard Brawl (2018)

References

External links 
  Calvin Tankman on MLW.com
 
 

1994 births
Living people
American male professional wrestlers
African-American male professional wrestlers
Sportspeople from Muncie, Indiana
Professional wrestlers from Indiana
MLW World Tag Team Champions